The WWE series (currently branded as WWE 2K; and formerly known as SmackDown!, SmackDown vs. Raw, or simply WWE) is a series of professional wrestling video games based on the American professional wrestling promotion WWE. The series was originally published by THQ until 2013, when Take-Two Interactive's 2K Sports took over. From 2000 to 2018, the series was primarily developed by Yuke's.; Visual Concepts has been the lead developer since 2019. Initially exclusive to Sony's PlayStation video game consoles, the series would expand to all seventh generation consoles by 2008. The series is among the best-selling video game franchises with 47 million copies shipped as of 2009.  

The WWE game engine was originally based on that used by Yuke's Toukon Retsuden and Rumble Roses series. Yuke's also published the WWE series in Japan, under the title of Exciting Pro Wrestling. With the release of WWE SmackDown vs. Raw 2007 in 2006, THQ took over as the Japanese publisher and the series adopted the western name.

Titles

SmackDown! series

SmackDown vs. Raw series

WWE series

WWE 2K series

Spin-offs

See also

List of WWE personnel
List of WWE video games
WWE
WWE 2K

References

External links
WWE 2K Games official website

Lists of video games by franchise
2K Games video games
2K Games video games